Leonardo Tavares (born 20 February 1984) is a Portuguese professional tennis player. He has regularly competed on the ATP Challenger Tour throughout his career. In August 2010, he achieved a career-high singles world ranking of no. 186.

Earlier in his career, Tavares played in the ITF Men's Circuit. However, a breakthrough year in 2009 led him to his first Challenger final in August. He became a mainstay at that level, capturing several doubles titles and breaking into the top 100 doubles ranking. Tavares reached a career high no. 95 ranking in September 2010. He played regularly for the Portugal Davis Cup team between 2002 and 2011.

Tavares is currently inactive, having played his last tournament in May 2016.

Career finals

ATP Challenger Tour

Singles: 2 (0 titles, 2 runners-up)

Doubles: 10 (5 titles, 5 runners-up)

ITF Men's Circuit

Singles: 7 (2 titles, 5 runners-up)

Doubles: 25 (13 titles, 12 runners-up)

Performance timelines

''Current through 2016 ATP World Tour.

Singles

Doubles

Wins over top 10 players

Doubles

Head-to-head vs. Top 20 players
This section contains Tavares' win–loss record against players who have been ranked 20th or higher in the world rankings during their careers.

Career earnings

* As of 10 April 2017.

National participation

Davis Cup (15 wins, 16 losses)
Tavares debuted for the Portugal Davis Cup team in 2002 and has played 31 matches in 20 ties. His singles record is 5–9 and his doubles record is 10–7 (15–16 overall).

   indicates the result of the Davis Cup match followed by the score, date, place of event, the zonal classification and its phase, and the court surface.

Awards
2013 – ITF Commitment Award

Notes

References

External links 

 
 
 

1984 births
Living people
Portuguese male tennis players
People from Espinho, Portugal
Sportspeople from Aveiro District